Kodad mandal is one of the 23 mandals in Suryapet district of the Indian state of Telangana. It is under the administration of Kodad revenue division with its headquarters at Kodad. The mandal is located on the banks of Paler river and is bounded by Nadigudem, Munagala, Chilkur, Huzurnagar, Mellachervu mandals. A portion of it also borders Khammam district and the state of Andhra Pradesh.

Towns and villages 

 census of India, the mandal has 12 settlements. It includes 1 town and 11 villages.

The settlements in the mandal are listed below:

Notes
(†) Mandal headquarter

References

Mandals in Suryapet district